V Lowland Brigade, Royal Field Artillery (Territorial Force) was a field artillery brigade formed from three Territorial Force Royal Horse Artillery batteries in January 1916.  It was assigned to the 52nd (Lowland) Division to replace I Lowland Brigade, RFA (T.F.) and joined the division in Egypt.

The brigade was reformed as horse artillery in July 1917, redesignated as XX Brigade, Royal Horse Artillery (Territorial Force) and joined the Yeomanry Mounted Division (later 1st Mounted Division and 4th Cavalry Division).

The brigade saw active service in World War I in the Sinai and Palestine Campaign in 1917 and 1918.  It remained in Palestine on occupation duties after the end of the war and was finally disbanded in November 1919.

History

Formation
The pre-war Territorial Force infantry divisions were generally supported by four field artillery brigades.  These were numbered I, II, III and IV within each division and consisted of three gun brigades (each of three batteries, equipped with four 15-pounder guns) and a howitzer brigade (two batteries of four 5" howitzers).

When the 52nd (Lowland) Division was ordered to Gallipoli in May 1915, it left two of its field artillery brigades behind in the UK on the Forth Defences.  III Lowland Brigade, RFA (T.F.) (1st, 2nd and 3rd Glasgow Batteries and Brigade Ammunition Column) rejoined the division in Egypt in March 1916, but I Lowland Brigade, RFA (T.F.) (1st and 2nd Edinburgh and Midlothian Batteries and Brigade Ammunition Column) proceeded to France in October 1915 where it was re-equipped with 18 pounders and joined 51st (Highland) Division.

V Lowland Brigade, RFA (T.F.) was formed on 13 January 1916 at Leicester to replace I Lowland Brigade, RFA in 52nd Division.  It consisted of the Essex, Hampshire and West Riding RHA Batteries and a Brigade Ammunition Column (BAC).  Before departing for the Middle East, each of the batteries were re-equipped with four 18 pounders.

52nd (Lowland) Division

The brigade embarked between 15 and 18 February 1916 at Devonport and arrived at Port Said on 2 March.  It joined 52nd (Lowland) Division at El Qantara on 17 March in the Suez Canal Defences.  The brigade was renumbered as CCLXIII Brigade, RFA (T.F.) on 28 May and Hampshire RHA as A Battery, Essex RHA as B Battery, and West Riding RHA as C Battery on the same date.  On 15 September, the brigade was renumbered as CCLXIV Brigade, RFA (T.F.) and on 30 December back to CCLXIII Brigade, RFA (T.F.).

Also on 30 December, C Battery (formerly West Riding RHA) was broken up: one section went to A Battery (formerly Hampshire RHA) and the other section to B Battery (former Essex RHA).  The brigade now consisted of two batteries of six 18 pounders each.

While with 52nd (Lowland) Division, the division took part in the Battle of Romani (4 and 5 August 1916) and the First (26 and 27 March 1917) and Second (1719 April 1917) Battles of Gaza.

Conversion to horse artillery
At the end of June 1917, arrangements were made to reform the brigade as a horse artillery brigade.  On 5 July 1917, the brigade exchanged its 18 pounders for 13 pounders and was redesignated as XX Brigade, RHA (T.F.).  Essex and Hampshire Batteries RHA were reformed with four 13 pounders each; West Riding Battery RHA was not reformed at this point.

The brigade (with the Hampshire Battery) joined the Yeomanry Mounted Division at Khan Yunis on 5 July.  Essex Battery, RHA remained with 52nd (Lowland) Division until 17 September 1917 when it joined 7th Mounted Brigade which had returned to Egypt from Salonika on 29 June.

Yeomanry Mounted / 1st Mounted / 4th Cavalry Divisions
Berkshire, RHA (four 13 pounders) joined the Yeomanry Mounted Division with 6th Mounted Brigade on 27 June 1917 and transferred to XX Brigade when it joined the division on 5 July 1917.  Likewise, Leicestershire, RHA (also four 13 pounders) transferred from ANZAC Mounted Division on 20 June 1916 and joined the brigade on 5 July 1917.  The brigade remained with the division when it was restructured and indianized as the 1st Mounted Division (from 24 April 1918) and later renamed as 4th Cavalry Division (23 July 1918).

During its time with the Yeomanry Mounted Division, the division served as part of the Egyptian Expeditionary Force in Palestine.  From 31 October it took part in the Third Battle of Gaza, including the Battle of Beersheba (in GHQ Reserve) and the Capture of the Sheria Position under the Desert Mounted Corps (DMC).  Still with the DMC, it took part in the Battle of Mughar Ridge on 13 and 14 November and the Battle of Nebi Samwil from 17 to 24 November.  From 27 to 29 November, it withstood the Turkish counter-attacks during the Capture of Jerusalem.

Once the division was restructured and renamed, it served with the DMC for the rest of the war, taking part in the Second Transjordan Raid (30 April to 4 May 1918) and the Final Offensive, in particular the Battle of Megiddo (19 to 25 September) and the Capture of Damascus (1 October).

The 4th Cavalry Division remained in Palestine on occupation duties after the end of the war.  However, demobilization began immediately and most of the British war time units had left by May 1919.  The Berkshire and Leicestershire batteries were reduced to cadre in Egypt on 14 October 1919.  The Headquarters was disbanded on 2 November 1919.

See also

Notes

References

Bibliography

External links
The Royal Horse Artillery on The Long, Long Trail

Royal Horse Artillery brigades
Artillery units and formations of World War I
Military units and formations established in 1916
Military units and formations disestablished in 1919